

Satellite orders

Spacebus-300

Spacebus-1000

Spacebus-2000

Spacebus-3000A

Spacebus-3000B2

Spacebus-3000B3

Spacebus-3000B3S

Spacebus-4000B2

Spacebus-4000B3

Spacebus-4000C1

Spacebus-4000C2

Spacebus-4000C3

Spacebus-4000C4

Spacebus-Neo-100

Spacebus-Neo-200

Space-Inspire

Satellite cancellations

See also 

 Spacebus

References 

Spacebus